Nolad Lirkod (Hebrew:נולד לרקוד) or Born to Dance was an Israeli televised dance competition with a format based on the American show So You Think You Can Dance. Airing on Israel's Channel 2 and hosted by Zvika Hadar, the show premiered in late 2005 and finished its run in spring of 2008, after broadcasting three seasons.  Like other shows in the So You Think You Can Dance franchise, Nolad Lirkod was a talent search in which dancers from a wide variety of stylistic backgrounds competed in a broad selection of dance genres and were advanced between rounds through a combination of at-home-viewer call-in votes and decisions by a panel of expert judges.

Winners
2006 First season : Or Kahlon
2007 Second season : Julia Igelnik
2008 Third season : Netanel Blaish

See also
Dance on television

References

External links
 

Israel
Israeli reality television series
Dance competition television shows
2005 Israeli television series debuts
2008 Israeli television series endings
2000s Israeli television series
Israeli television series based on American television series